Càrn Glas is a mountain with the Ardgoil Peninsula and the Arrochar Alps near Lochgoilhead.

Mountains and hills of Highland (council area)